Dragana Ilić (born 29 June 1979) is a Serbian former professional tennis player.

A right-handed player, Ilić represented Yugoslavia in a total of nine Fed Cup ties across the 1995 and 1997 competitions, mostly as a doubles player. 

Ilić, who reached a career high ranking of 451, featured in the qualifying draw for a WTA Tour tournament in Istanbul in 1998 and the following year won an ITF tournament in Kastoria.

From 2004 to 2006, she played college tennis in the United States for Lynn University.

ITF Circuit finals

Singles: 2 (1–1)

Doubles: 7 (1–6)

References

External links
 
 
 

1979 births
Living people
Serbian female tennis players
Serbia and Montenegro female tennis players
Lynn Fighting Knights women's tennis players